Seema Bhargava Pahwa (born 10 February 1962) is an Indian actress and director known for her comedic characters in films and television. She rose to prominence for her role of Badki in the popular Doordarshan soap opera Hum Log (1984-1985). As a theatre actress, she worked with Delhi-based theatre group Sambhav, before moving to Mumbai in 1994 to work in films and continue her work in television and theatre. She has received several awards including two Filmfare Awards. She directed Ramprasad ki Tehrvi, her debut as a director.

Career
Pahwa rose to prominence for her role of Badki in the popular Doordarshan soap opera Hum Log (1984-1985). As a theatre actor she worked with Delhi-based theatre group Sambhav, before moving to Mumbai in 1994 to work in films and continue her work in television and theatre.

Subsequently, she played Maasi, or Aunt on Kasamh Se (2006-2009), a popular Zee TV soap opera by Ekta Kapoor. The character is very kind and loving towards her nephew and his wife Bani Walia, the protagonist. She won Star Screen Award for Best Supporting Actress at the 2015 Screen Awards for the movie Ankhon Dekhi.

In 2014, she received acclaim for experiential theatre performance of Bhisham Sahni's satire on the middle-class, Saag Meat, where she cooked during the performance, and the food was served to the audience. She was also very popularly loved for her role in the series Hip Hip Hurray, where she played the role of a single mother of Mazhar.

At the 63rd Filmfare Awards, she was nominated twice for the Filmfare Award for Best Supporting Actress for the films Bareilly Ki Barfi (2017) and Shubh Mangal Saavdhan (2017). She received another nomination for the Filmfare Award for Best Supporting Actress at the 65th Filmfare Awards for her role in Bala (2019).

She made her directorial debut with the film Ramprasad Ki Tehrvi which was premiered at Mumbai Film Festival in 2019 followed by a theatrical release in 2021.

Personal life
She was born Seema Bhargava. She is married to actor Manoj Pahwa, a co-actor in Hum Log, and lives in Versova, Mumbai along with their daughter Manukriti and son Mayank. On 02-March-2022, her son Mayank Pahwa married Sanah Kapur, daughter of actors Pankaj Kapur and Supriya Pathak Kapur. Sanah is a half-sister of actor Shahid Kapoor and granddaughter of veteran character artiste Dina Pathak.

Filmography

Films

Television

Web series

Awards and nominations

References

External links
 

Living people
Indian television actresses
Indian film actresses
Actresses in Hindi cinema
Actresses in Hindi television
People from Delhi
Screen Awards winners
Indian stage actresses
1962 births